Dichagyris cataclivis is a species of cutworm or dart moth in the family Noctuidae. It is found in North America.

The MONA or Hodges number for Dichagyris cataclivis is 10870.1.

References

Further reading

 
 
 

cataclivis
Articles created by Qbugbot
Moths described in 1910
Moths of North America